Santa Gema Fútbol Club was a Panamanian football team playing at the Liga Panameña de Fútbol, the team was disbanded by the league for lack of funds on May 10, 2019 and was relegated to amateur pyramidal level.

It is based in Arraiján, Panamá and it was founded in 1983.

History
The club was created in 1983  and played in the Arraiján District's local football league. In 2011, Santa Gema was promoted to the Liga Nacional de Ascenso after defeating Club Atlético Evolution 4–0 in the 2011 edition of the Copa Rommel Fernández.

Honours
Copa Rommel Fernández: 1
2011

Historical list of coaches
 Rony Rojo (2014)
 Leopoldo Lee (2015)
 Jose Anthony Torres (2018-Present)

References

Football clubs in Panama
Association football clubs established in 1983
Defunct football clubs in Panama
1983 establishments in Panama